Richard Milward DD ( – 20 December 1680) was a Canon of Windsor from 1666 to 1680

Career

He was educated at Trinity College, Cambridge and graduated BA in 1629, MA in 1632, and DD in 1662.

He was appointed:
Rector of Braxted, Essex 1643 - 1680
Vicar of Isleworth 1678 - 1680

He was appointed to the sixth stall in St George's Chapel, Windsor Castle in 1666 and held the canonry until 1680.

Works
Milward acted as amanuensis to John Selden, and edited his Table Talk (1689).

Notes 

1680 deaths
Canons of Windsor
Alumni of Trinity College, Cambridge
Amanuenses
Year of birth unknown